Solovar is a fictional superhero character appearing in American comic books published by DC Comics. Solovar is a sapient gorilla and leader of a race of gorillas that first appeared as supporting characters of Flash.

Solovar appears in The Flash, voiced by Keith David.

Publication history
Solovar first appeared in The Flash #106 and was created by John Broome and Carmine Infantino.

Fictional character biography
For many years, Solovar is the leader of Gorilla City, a hidden city of hyper-intelligent gorillas. Renowned for his wisdom and psychic powers, he is virtually unchallenged, except by the villainous Gorilla Grodd, and his servant Monsieur Mallah. This rivalry is so great that, after Solovar is captured by humans (playing dumb to keep his identity and origin secret), Grodd follows him to Central City to learn the secrets of Solovar's force-of-mind powers. He succeeds in this, but the Flash captures him after Solovar escapes and tells the Flash of Grodd.

The Flash helped the gorilla leader escape and became the first human to learn of the city's existence, and its location. This leads to a rivalry between Grodd and the Flash, as well as an alliance between the Flash and Solovar. Flash has helped to defeat Grodd many times.

Under Solovar's guidance, Gorilla City is a technological utopia. Eventually, he decides his people can no longer use their science to hide from the human world. Believing that the world's ecological and political problems cannot be solved by ignoring them, he opens his city's borders to the world and asks for membership in the United Nations. He advocates peace — among the gorillas and with humans — and is behind two diplomatic overtures to the human world. The second tour of the U.S., sadly, is cut short by his assassination by a lethal car bomb. While a mysterious group calling itself the Human Supremacy Movement takes credit for the act, it is quickly made clear to the reader that Solovar's assassination at the hands of human racists is in fact a ruse concocted by the Simian Scarlet, a group of gorillas within Gorilla City seeking to overthrow the ruling council (the manipulators, however, are themselves being manipulated by Gorilla Grodd).

Solovar is briefly succeeded by his nephew, Ulgo. With tensions between humans and gorillas rising, the JLA is invited to Gorilla City to assist in a diplomatic mission, only to fall victim to an ambush. In the heat of battle, the gorilla army tests its new weapon on the heroes, a "gorillabomb" that transforms humans into gorillas. While the JLA retreat to their moonbase to find a cure, Prince Ulgo appears before the United Nations to formally declare war on the human race.

However, he promises, there will be no bloodshed in the battle, and he makes his point by detonating a gorillabomb in the auditorium. With the entire UN assembly transformed both mentally and physically into gorillas, the JLA act swiftly to minimize damage and loss of life. Alas, saving the delegates uses up their only chance to change back into humans, and so our transformed heroes must remain in their simian forms until they can find another way to return to normal.

Not that they are allowed much time to do this; as the Martian Manhunter telepathically learns, the gorillas are strategically targeting several places around the globe, including Themyscira (Wonder Woman's homeland), Atlantis (Aquaman's kingdom), Central City, Blüdhaven (a suburb of Batman's Gotham City), Metropolis (where Superman lives, one of the largest cities in the DC Universe), and low Earth orbit (Green Lantern's). The heroes split up and set out to neutralize the gorilla army, end the human-gorilla war, and find a way to return to normal.

Once the JLA have achieved their goals, Ulgo is later succeeded by Solovar's son, Nnamdi.

During the Blackest Night, Barry Allen raced to Gorilla City to seek aid from Solovar, not knowing of his death. Finding the city ravaged, Allen assumed Grodd had attacked, only to discover Solovar had been reanimated as a Black Lantern. Barry managed to temporarily stop him by dragging his corpse through the air at superspeed while leaving it outside the protective aura his body generated when he took passengers, reducing Solovar's Black Lantern self to dust when he could not cope with the friction that he was being subjected to.

The New 52
Solovar, in the new universe, is the founder and first ruler of Gorilla City, regarded as the Forefather of his species. He, his herd and his family had been around during the apex of the Mayan civilization just moments before its abrupt destruction by a metaphysical force. As the Speed Force destroyed the ancient culture in a blare of lightning, that same bolt of energy struck him and a few other apes within the vicinity, creating the first few in a new generation of superintelligent gorillas who would come to found the hidden nation of Gorilla City.

Powers and abilities
Solovar possesses similar physical and mental abilities akin to Gorilla Grodd stemming from the same meteorite that evolved them and the rest of their brethren. Though not as significantly developed as his evil counterpart, Solovar is a gifted mentalist in his own right. As well as an able bodied political activist being king of his own highly advanced civilization and an accomplished diplomat with savvy knowledge of world affairs. Other than that, Solovar, like all apes of Gorilla City, boasts an accomplished intellect knowing the workarounds of all his nations advanced science and technology. Being a contributing pioneer to its development himself. He also boasts the augmented physical abilities of all Super Apes of his homeland, he also has vastly augmented physical abilities.

During the events of the Blackest Night the deceased king Solovar is reanimated by a Black Power Ring and gifted with all the abilities that come with being a Black Lantern, such as accelerated regeneration, emotional reading and consumption by removing the hearts of the living, simulation of old powers from his previous life and the typical functions allotted by a Power Ring.

Within the DCnU reboot, Solovar was the first among his lineage of apes touched by The Light. Solovar naturally possesses a greater physical and mental constitution greater than humans and most of his fellow apes.

Other versions

Flashpoint
In the Flashpoint reality, Solovar was the original ruler of Gorilla City until he was overthrown by Gorilla Grodd.

Scooby-Doo Team-Up
Solovar appears in the Scooby-Doo Team-Up story titled "The Ghost of Gorilla City." He helps Mystery Inc. by helping them escape from the zombies and deal with Ghost-rilla.

In other media

Television
 Solovar appears in the Challenge of the Super Friends episode "Revenge on Gorilla City", voiced by Michael Rye.
 Solovar appears in the Justice League episode "The Brave and the Bold", voiced by David Ogden Stiers. This version is an albino gorilla with white fur and black skin who lacks psionic powers and is Gorilla City's chief of security.
 Solovar appears in the Justice League Unlimited episode "Dead Reckoning", voiced again by David Ogden Stiers.
 An alternate universe incarnation of Solovar appears in The Flash, voiced by Keith David. This version is a gruff yet wise, valiant, and honorable albino gorilla from Earth-2. In the two-part episode "Attack on Gorilla City" and "Attack on Central City", Team Flash encounter him after Gorilla Grodd tricks them into helping him overthrow Solovar and take over Gorilla City. Upon realizing their mistake, Team Flash convince Solovar to defeat Grodd to reclaim his throne and spare him so they can take him into A.R.G.U.S.'s custody. Additionally, a mental projection of Solovar appears in the episode "Grodd Friended Me".

Video games
 Solovar appears in Justice League Heroes, voiced by Nick Jameson. This version is an albino gorilla with white fur and gray skin.
 Solovar appears as a playable character in Lego DC Super-Villains, voiced by JB Blanc. This version overthrew Gorilla Grodd to become ruler of Gorilla City.

Miscellaneous
 Solovar appears in Young Justice #18 and #19. This version is initially a normal gorilla from Bwunda, where he leads a troop of gorillas, including his mate Boka and son Nnamdi, before they were captured by a group of scientists led by the Brain and Ultra-Humanite and taken to Gorilla City. Holding the offspring captive, they experimented on the adults to increase their intelligence and injected them with Kobra venom to increase their strength. The gorillas gained telepathy, but withheld this from their captors. In the present, Ultra-Humanite uses the gorillas to attack and capture the Team, though Miss Martian and Wolf escaped. Upon finding her, the gorillas ask for her and the Team's help, explaining her history to them. Once Miss Martian rescues the offspring, Dick Grayson frees the adults, allowing them to join forces with the Team to fight their captors. Though the Brain and Ultra-Humanite escape, the gorillas return to their safe haven.
 Solovar appears in the Injustice 2 prequel comic as the kind yet ruthless leader of Gorilla City who shares Grodd's enmity towards humanity and seeks out aid from Ra's al Ghul and the League of Assassins to prune mankind's population to a more manageable size.

References

Characters created by John Broome
Characters created by Carmine Infantino
Comics characters introduced in 1959
Animal superheroes
DC Comics superheroes
DC Comics animals
DC Comics metahumans
DC Comics characters who can move at superhuman speeds
DC Comics characters with superhuman strength
DC Comics telepaths
Fictional hypnotists and indoctrinators
Fictional kings 
Fictional male royalty
Fictional characters who can manipulate time
Fictional characters with dimensional travel abilities
Fictional characters with precognition
Fictional characters with superhuman durability or invulnerability
Flash (comics) characters
Gorilla characters in comics
Time travelers
Legion of Super-Pets